Henry James Hoare (17 September 1812 – 16 February 1859) was an English first-class cricketer and brewer.

The son of the cricketer and brewer George Hoare, he was born at Morden in September 1812. He was educated at Harrow School, before going up to St John's College, Cambridge. After graduating from Cambridge, Hoare became a partner in the family brewing business. He later played first-class cricket for the Marylebone Cricket Club between 1835 and 1838, making six appearances. He scored 98 runs in these matches, with a highest score of 37 not out. He married Julia Seymour Traherne in 1849, having issue. Hoare died at Torquay in February 1859 and was buried at Morden. His son, Charles, was also a first-class cricketer, as was his brother Charles Hugh Hoare.

References

External links

1812 births
1859 deaths
People from Morden
People educated at Harrow School
Alumni of St John's College, Cambridge
English brewers
English cricketers
Marylebone Cricket Club cricketers
19th-century English businesspeople